Dual consciousness is a theoretical concept in neuroscience. It is proposed that it is possible that a person may develop two separate conscious entities within their one brain after undergoing a corpus callosotomy. The idea first began circulating in the neuroscience community after some split-brain patients exhibited the alien hand syndrome, which led some scientists to believe that there must be two separate consciousnesses within the brain's left and right hemispheres in competition with one another once the corpus callosum is severed.

The idea of dual consciousness has caused controversy in the neuroscience community. No conclusive evidence of the proposed phenomenon has been discovered.

Background 
During the first half of the 20th century, some neurosurgeons concluded that the best option of treating severe epilepsy was by severing the patient's corpus callosum. The corpus callosum is the primary communication mechanism between the brain's two cerebral hemispheres. For example, communication across the callosum allows information from both the left and right visual fields to be interpreted by the brain in a way that makes sense to comprehend the person's actual experience (visual inputs from both eyes are interpreted by the brain to make sense of the experience that you are looking at a computer that is directly in front of you). The procedure of surgically removing the corpus callosum is called a corpus callosotomy. Patients who have undergone a corpus callosotomy are colloquially referred to as "split-brain patients". They are called so because now their brain's left and right hemispheres are no longer connected by the corpus callosum.

Split-brain patients have been subjects for numerous psychological experiments that sought to discover what occurs in the brain now that the primary interhemispheric pathways have been disrupted. Notable researchers in the field include Roger Sperry, one of the first to publish ideas involving a dual consciousness, and his famous graduate student, Michael Gazzaniga. Their results found a pattern among patients: severing the entire corpus callosum stops the interhemispheric transfer of perceptual, sensory, motor, and other forms of information. For most cases, corpus callosotomies did not in any way affect patients' real-world functioning; however, those psychology experiments have demonstrated some interesting differences between split-brain patients and normal subjects.

Split-brain patients and the corpus callosotomy 

The first successful corpus callosotomies on humans were performed in the 1930s. The purpose of the procedure was to alleviate the effects of epilepsy when other forms of treatment (medications) had failed to stop the violent convulsions associated with the disorder. Epileptic seizures occur because of abnormal electrical discharges that spread across areas of the brain. William Van Wagenen proposed the idea of severing the corpus callosum to eliminate transcortical electrical signals across the brain's hemispheres. If this could be achieved, then the seizures should be reduced or even eliminated.

The general procedure of a corpus callosotomy is as follows. The patient is put under anesthesia. Once the patient is in deep sleep, a craniotomy is performed. This procedure removes a section of the skull, leaving the brain exposed and accessible to the surgeon. The dura mater is pulled back so the deeper areas of the brain, including the corpus callosum, can be seen. Specialized instruments are placed into the brain that allows safe severing of the corpus. Initially, a partial callosotomy is performed, which only severs the front two-thirds of the callosum. It is important to note that because the back section of the callosum is preserved, visual information is still sent across both hemispheres. Though the corpus callosum loses a majority of its functioning during a partial callosotomy, it does not completely lose its capabilities. If this operation does not succeed in reducing the seizures, a complete callosotomy is needed to reduce the severity of the seizures.

A similar type of procedure, known as a commissurotomy, involves severing a number of interhemispheric tracts (such as the anterior commissure, the hippocampal commissure and the massa intermedia of the thalamus) in addition to the corpus callosum.

After surgery, the split-brain patients are often given extensive neuropsychological assessments. An interesting finding among split-brain patients is many of them claim to feel normal after the surgery and do not feel that their brains are "split". The corpus callosotomy and commissurotomy have been successful in reducing, and in some cases, eliminating epileptic seizures. Van Wagenen's theory was correct.

Alien hand syndrome 

Alien hand syndrome, sometimes used synonymously with anarchic hand is a neurological disorder in which the afflicted person's hand appears to take on a mind of its own. Alien hand syndrome has been documented in some split brain patients.

Symptoms 

The classic sign of Alien Hand Syndrome is that the affected person cannot control one of their hands. For example, if a split-brain patient with Alien Hand Syndrome is asked to pick up a glass with their right hand, as the right hand moves over to the glass, the left hand will interfere with the action, thwarting the right hand's task. The interference from the left hand is completely out of the control of the patient and is not being done "on purpose". Affected patients at times cannot control the movements of their hands. Another example included patients unbuttoning a shirt with one hand, and the other hand simultaneously re-buttoning the shirt (although some reported feeling normal after their surgery).

Relationship to dual consciousness 

When scientists first started observing the alien hand syndrome in split-brain patients, they began to question the nature of consciousness and began to theorize that perhaps when the corpus callosum is cut, consciousness also is split into two separate entities. This development added to the general appeal of split-brain research.

Gazzaniga and LeDoux's experiment

Procedure and results 

In 1978, Michael Gazzaniga and Joseph DeLoux discovered a unique phenomenon among split-brain patients who were asked to perform a simultaneous concept task. The patient was shown 2 pictures: of a house in the winter time and of a chicken's claw. The pictures were positioned so they would exclusively be seen in only one visual field of the brain (the winter house was positioned so it would only be seen in the patient's left visual field (LVF), which corresponds to the brain's right hemisphere, and the chicken's claw was placed so it would only be seen in the patient's right visual field (RVF), which corresponds to the brain's left hemisphere).

A series of pictures was placed in front of the patients. Gazzaniga and LeDoux then asked the patient to choose a picture with his right hand and a picture with his left hand. The paradigm was set up so the choices would be obvious for the patients. A snow shovel is used for shoveling the snowy driveway of the winter house and a chicken's head correlates to the chicken's claw. The other pictures do not in any way correlate with the 2 original pictures. In the study, a patient chose the snow shovel with his left hand (corresponding to his brain's right hemisphere) and his right hand chose the chicken's head (corresponding to the brain's left hemisphere). When the patient was asked why he had chosen the pictures he had chosen, the answer he gave was "The chicken claw goes with the chicken head, and you need a snow shovel to clean out the chicken shed."

Why would he say this? Wouldn't it be obvious that the shovel goes with the winter house? For people with an intact corpus callosum, yes it is obvious, but not for a split-brain patient. Both the winter house and the shovel are being projected to the patient from his LVF, so his right hemisphere is receiving and processing the information and this input is completely independent from what is going on in the RVF, which involves the chicken's claw and head (the information being processed in the left hemisphere). The human brain's left hemisphere is primarily responsible interpreting the meaning of the sensory input it receives from both fields; however, the left hemisphere has no knowledge of the winter house. Because it has no knowledge of the winter house, it must invent a logical reason for why the shovel was chosen. Since the only objects it has to work with are the chicken's claw and head, the left hemisphere interprets the meaning of choosing the shovel as "it is an object necessary to help the chicken, which lives in a shed, therefore, the shovel is used to clean the chicken’s shed." Gazzaniga famously coined the term left brain interpreter to explain this phenomenon.

Interpreting Gazzaniga's "left brain interpreter" 

What does the results of Gazzaniga and LeDoux's work suggest about the existence of a dual consciousness? There are varying possibilities.
 The left hemisphere dominates all interpretation of the split-brain patient's perceptual field, with the right hemisphere having little importance in these processes.
 If so, one could by extension claim there are 2 separate conscious entities that do not interact with each other or are in competition with each other and have separate interpretations of the stimuli, the left hemisphere winning the struggle.
 Or perhaps the right hemisphere is unconscious of the snow house and shovel while the left hemisphere retains a conscious perception of its objects.

Other experiments

Sperry–Gazzaniga 

The Gazzaniga–LeDoux studies were based on previous studies done by Sperry and Gazzaniga. Sperry examined split-brain patients. Sperry's experiment included a subject being seated at a table, with a shield blocking the visions from the subject's hands, including the objects on the table and the examiner seated across. The shield was also used as a viewing screen. On the shield, the examiner can select to present the visual material to both hemispheres or to selective hemispheres by means of having the patient look at certain points on the viewing screen. The patient is briefly exposed to the stimuli on the viewing screen. The stimuli shown to the left eye goes to the right hemisphere and the visual material shown to the right eye will be projected to the left hemisphere. During the experiment, when the stimulus was shown to the left side of the screen, the patient indicated he did not see anything. Patients have shown the inability to describe in writing or in speech the stimuli that was shown briefly to the left side. The speaking hemisphere, which in most people is the left hemisphere, would not have awareness of stimulus being shown to the right hemisphere (left visual field), except the left hand was able to point to the correct object. Based on his observations and data, Sperry concluded each hemisphere possessed its own consciousness.

Revonsuo 

Revonsuo explains a procedure that was similar in nature to the Sperry–Gazzaniga design. Split-brain patients are shown a picture with two objects: a flower and a rabbit. The flower is exclusively shown in the right visual field, which is interpreted by the left hemisphere and the rabbit is exclusively shown in the left visual field, which is interpreted by the right hemisphere. The left brain is seeing the flower as the right brain is simultaneously viewing the rabbit. When the patients were asked what they saw, patients said they only saw the flower and did not see the rabbit. The flower is in the right visual field and the left hemisphere can only see the flower. The left hemisphere dominates the interpretation of the stimulus and since it cannot see the rabbit (only being represented in the right hemisphere), patients do not believe they saw a rabbit. They can, however, still point to the rabbit with their left hand. Revonsuo stated that it seemed that one consciousness saw the flower and another consciousness saw the rabbit independently from one another.

Joseph 

Rhawn Joseph observed two patients who had both undergone a complete corpus callosotomy. Joseph observed that the right hemisphere of one of the patients is able to gather, comprehend, and express information. The right hemisphere was able to direct activity to the patient's left arm and leg. The execution of the left arm and leg's action as was inhibited by the left hemisphere. Joseph found that the patient's left leg would attempt to move forward as if to walk straight but the right leg would either refuse to move or begin to walk in the opposite direction. After observing the struggles of the execution of activities involving the left and right arms and legs, led Joseph to believe that the two hemispheres possessed their own consciousness.

Joseph also noted that the patient had other specific instances of conflict between the right and left hemispheres including, the left hand (right hemisphere) carrying out actions contrary to the left hemisphere's motives such as the left hand turning off the television immediately after the right hand turned it on. Joseph found that the patient's left leg would only allow the patient to return home when the patient was going for a walk and would reject continuing to go for that walk.

Further observations by Joseph 

In the laboratory, a patient was given two different fabrics: a wire screen in his left hand and a piece of sandpaper in his right hand. The patient received two different fabrics out of his view so that neither eye nor hemisphere visually seen what his hands were given. When the patient was indicating what fabric was in the left hand, he was able to correctly indicate and point with the left hand to the wire screen after it had been set on a table. As he pointed with his left hand, however, the right hand tried to stop the left hand and make the left hand point to the fabric that the right hand was holding. The left hand continued to point at the correct fabric, even though the right hand tried to forcefully move the left hand. During the struggle, the patient also verbalized feelings of animosity by saying, "That’s wrong!" and "I hate this hand." Joseph concluded that the left hemisphere did not understand at all why the left hand (right hemisphere) would point to a different material.

Controversy and alternative explanations 

Proponents of the dual consciousness theory have caused a great amount of controversy and debate within the neuroscience community. The magnitude of such a claim: that consciousness can be split into two entities within the one brain are considered by some scientists to be audacious. There is no concrete evidence to validate the theory and the current evidence provided is, at best, anecdotal.

The most powerful claims against the dual consciousness theory are:
 There is no universally accepted definition of "consciousness".
 Split-brain patients are not the only people to exhibit the Alien Hand Syndrome. People with intact brains who have suffered a stroke may also have the Alien Hand Syndrome. It also has been observed in patients with Alzheimer's disease or in patients who have brain tumors.
 Other existing and established neurological mechanisms can account for an explanation of the same phenomena.

Gonzalo Munevar has proposed an alternative explanation to demonstrate that these strange behaviors are spawned from areas in the brain and not by a dual consciousness. Two cortical areas in particular, the supplementary motor area (SMA) and the premotor cortex (PMC), are crucial in the planning of executing motor tasks to external stimuli presented in the person's perceptual field. For example, a person may pick up a glass of water with his right hand and put it up to his lips for a drink. The person may have picked up the glass with his right hand, but well before this action takes place, the PMC and SMA consider a variety of different possibilities of how this action could be performed. He could have picked it up with his left hand, his mouth, even his foot! He could have done it quickly or slowly. Many possibilities are entertained, but few are actually executed. These actions are sent from the PMC to the Motor Cortex for execution. The rest are inhibited by the SMA and are not performed.

It is also important to understand that the processes of the SMA and PMC are done unconsciously. The SMA and PMC consider the many alternative actions many milliseconds before the chosen action takes place. The person is never consciously aware of these alternative possibilities the brain has juggled with before he picks it up with the right hand; he just does it. The action of picking up the glass with the right hand is also performed unconsciously. It may be preferable to use his right hand because he is right handed and doing so is therefore more comfortable or perhaps the glass is placed on his right side and the possibility that expends the least amount of energy is using the right hand to pick it up.

Another important fact about the PMC is that its activation is bilateral. When it is activated, it is activated in both hemispheres of the brain. Gazzaniga observed and wrote about this phenomenon. When the corpus callosum is severed, many interhemispheric interactions are disrupted. Many areas of the brain become compromised, including the SMA. If the SMA has trouble regulating and inhibiting the actions of the PMC, it is very possible that conflicting sets of actions may be sent to the MC and performed (accounting for both hands reaching for the glass, even if only one hand is intended to grab it). It would make the appearance that there is a dual consciousness competing for dominance over the other for control of the brain, but it is not the case.

The fact that the Alien Hand Syndrome eventually goes away in some split-brain patients is not evidence of one consciousness "defeating" the other and taking complete control of the brain. It is likely that the plasticity of the brain may be the cause for alleviating the disorder. Eventually the split patient's brain may find adaptive routes to compensate for the lost interhemispheric communication, such as alternative pathways involving subcortical structures that perform subcortical interhemispheric inhibition to regain a sense of normalcy between the two hemispheres.

Models of multiple consciousnesses

Michael Gazzaniga, while working on the model of dual consciousness, came to the conclusion that simple dual consciousness (i.e. right-brain/left-brain model of the mind) is a gross oversimplification and the brain is organized into hundreds maybe even thousands of modular-processing systems.

The theory of a division of consciousness was touched upon by Carl Jung in 1935 when he stated, "The so-called unity of consciousness is an illusion... we like to think that we are one but we are not."

Similar models (which also claim that mind is formed from many little agents, i.e. the brain is made up of a constellation of independent or semi-independent agents) were also described by:
 Marvin Minsky's "Society of Mind" model claims that mind is built up from the interactions of simple parts called agents, which are themselves mindless.
 Thomas R. Blakeslee described the brain model which claims that brain is composed of hundreds of independent centers of thought called "modules".
 Neurocluster Brain Model describes the brain as a massively parallel computing machine in which huge number of neuroclusters process information independently from each other. The neurocluster which most of the time has the access to actuators (i.e. neurocluster which most of the time acts upon an environment using actuators) is called the main personality. Other neuroclusters which do not have access to actuators or which have only short duration and limited access to actuators are called "autonomous neuroclusters".
 Michio Kaku described the brain model using the analogy of large corporation which is controlled by CEO.
 Robert E. Ornstein claimed that the mind is a squadron of simpletons.
 Ernest Hilgard described neodissociationist theory which claims that a "hidden observer" is created in the mind while hypnosis is taking place and this "hidden observer" has his own separate consciousness.
 George Ivanovich Gurdjieff in year 1915 taught his students that man has no single, big I; man is divided into a multiplicity of small I’s.

See also 
 Left brain interpreter
 Divided consciousness
 Lateralization of brain function
 Bicameral mentality
 Laterality
 Alien hand syndrome
 Society of Mind
 Parallel computing
 Mind-body problem
 Philosophy of mind
 Theory of mind
 Cognitive Neuroscience
 Julian Jaynes
 Of Two Minds (book)
 Open individualism
 Vertiginous question

References

Consciousness studies
Dichotomies
Mind–body problem
Consciousness
Neurological disorders